El Mark is a B-side EP recording released by the band Glassjaw in 2005 exclusively on iTunes. It consists of two previously released UK B-Sides (from the "Cosmopolitan Bloodloss" single) and a new previously unreleased track, entitled "Oxycodone". The track "The Number No Good Things Come Of" features Daryl Palumbo as the only Glassjaw member, Ross Robinson plays piano and Shannon Larkin is on drums. It is also the last Glassjaw release to feature Todd Weinstock.

Track listing

Writing credits
 All lyrics written by Daryl Palumbo
 All music written by Glassjaw

Glassjaw EPs
2005 EPs